In the creation and criticism of fictional works, a character flaw or heroic flaw is a bias, limitation, imperfection, problem, personality disorder, vice, phobia, prejudice, or deficiency present in a character who may be otherwise very functional. The flaw can be a problem that directly affects the character's actions and abilities, such as a violent temper. Alternatively, it can be a simple foible or personality defect, which affects the character's motives and social interactions, but little else.

Flaws can add complexity, depth and humanity to the characters in a narrative.  For example, the sheriff with a gambling addiction, the action hero who is afraid of heights, or a lead in a romantic comedy who must overcome his insecurity regarding male pattern baldness are all characters whose flaws help provide dimension.  Perhaps the most widely cited and classic of character flaws is Achilles' famous heel.

In general, flaws can be categorized as minor, major, or tragic.

Minor flaw
A minor character flaw is an imperfection which serves to distinguish the character in the mind of the reader / viewer / player / listener, making them memorable and individual, but otherwise does not affect the story in any way.

Examples of this could include a noticeable scar, a thick accent or a habit such as cracking their knuckles.

Protagonists and other major characters may (and usually do) have multiple minor flaws, making them more accessible, and enabling the reader / viewer / listener to relate to the character (in the case of a sympathetic character) or otherwise influence the audience's opinions of the character.

Many insignificant or archetypal characters which are encountered only once or rarely are defined solely by a single minor flaw, differentiating them from the stock character or archetype that they adhere to.

Major flaw
A major character flaw is a much more noticeable and important hindrance which actually impairs the individual, whether physically, mentally or morally. Sometimes major flaws are not actually negative per se (such as devout religious beliefs or a rigid code of honor), but are classified as such in that they often serve to hinder or restrict the character in some way.

Examples of this type of flaw could include blindness, amnesia or greed.

Unlike minor flaws, major flaws are almost invariably important to either the character's, or the story's development.

For villains, their major flaw is usually the cause of their eventual downfall.
For heroes, their major flaw usually must be overcome (either temporarily or permanently) at some point in the story, often at the climax, by their own determination or skill.
For neutral characters, or those that shift allegiance, the major flaw is usually the cause of either their corruption, redemption or both.
For the protagonist, the most visible flaw generally serves a more vital interest, as well, as it defines his or her core problem.  It is the protagonist's reluctant (and usually unconscious) journey to address this problem that forms the spine of the story, sometimes acting as the MacGuffin to stimulate the plot.

Tragic/fatal flaw
This is a specific sort of flaw, also known as "Hamartia", which is possessed by Aristotelian tragic heros. It is a flaw which causes an otherwise noble or exceptional character to bring about their own downfall and, often, their eventual death.

Examples of this could include hubris, misplaced trust, excessive curiosity, pride and lack of self-control.

This fall usually occurs at the beginning of a story, with the story itself concentrating on the consequences or attempted redemption of the fall.

Examples

Literature
Oedipus's downfall is directly linked to arrogance: Oedipus Rex
Macbeth suffers from hubris, leading to the murder of Duncan I of Scotland; he later becomes paranoid, leading him to order the deaths of Banquo and the family of Macduff: Macbeth
Prince Hamlet is indecisive and self-doubting, which thwarts him in avenging his father's murder: Hamlet
Victor Frankenstein suffers from excessive curiosity and irresponsibility, leading to the creation of the monster that destroys his life: Frankenstein
Ichabod Crane is selfish and wants to marry Katrina for her money.
Sigurd has a vulnerable spot on his back, where a linden leaf fell as he was bathing in dragon's blood: Völsunga saga 
Agamemnon acts in greed when he takes Briseis away from Achilles, losing the warrior's support in the Trojan War, whereas Achilles was held back by his own arrogance: The Iliad.
Odysseus' flaw was an extreme hubris which led him to dishonor the god Poseidon: The Odyssey
Cyrano De Bergerac, despite his many accomplishments, suffers from self-doubt because of his huge nose which keeps him from pursuing the woman he loves.
Marvin the Paranoid Android suffers from extreme depression, as well as extreme boredom due to his huge yet mostly inactive mind: The Hitchhiker's Guide to the Galaxy
Tom Riddle's extreme thanatophobia eventually transformed him into the vile Lord Voldemort in his pursuit for immortality: Harry Potter
Jo March's bluntness and hot temper cause conflict with her family: Little Women
Jacen Solo's eventual downfall is linked to his placing the weight of the galaxy on his shoulder in his desire for peace: Star Wars Legends
Billy Budd is a seaman who stammers at moments of emotion, which results in his killing a Royal Navy officer and being hanged for murder: Billy Budd

Film
Rocky Balboa thinks of himself as a loser who cannot go the distance in the boxing ring: Rocky
Rey is held back by her irrational and unconscious core belief of self-worthlessness, formed during the years after her abandonment on Jakku; this leeches off her feelings of happiness, and to cope with these feelings of self-worthlessness she relies on others for validation and approval, even going as far as doing things to please them, including BB-8 and Han Solo. Eventually, at the climax of her arc, when overpowered by Palpatine, she is given motivation by the Jedi of the past — this gives her enough mental strength to overcome not only Palpatine, the embodiment of her own insecurities, regardless of how much her life energy has been drained, but also her own insecurities: Star Wars
Carl Denham is an egotist: King Kong
Rick thinks of himself as an unfeeling cynic who denies the pain and disappointment from a failed love affair with Ilsa: Casablanca
Captain Hook is obsessed with Peter Pan.
Roy Batty, as a replicant, is powerful, but has a very short lifespan: Blade Runner
Oskar Schindler starts out blinded by his greedy nature, which he overcomes and instead finds compassion to sacrifice in order to save his workers: Schindler's List
Travis Bickle has an almost masochistic obsession with the dark mean streets of 1970s Manhattan, and frequently drives around them in his taxi to expose himself to the perceived urban decay, fueling his inner rage: Taxi Driver
John Hammond fails to create his vision due to his naïve nature: Jurassic Park

Television
Walter White's massive need to be seen as smart, powerful, and successful compels him to demand credit for each of his criminal successes, even when doing so puts his safety, freedom, family relationships, or future criminal endeavors at greater risk: Breaking Bad
B. A. Baracus is afraid of flying: The A-Team
Homer Simpson is not too bright and prone to reckless choices: The Simpsons
Philip J. Fry (usually) has a severe lack of intelligence: Futurama
Londo Mollari yearns to return to the "glory days" of the Centauri Republic: Babylon 5
Mr. Spock relies heavily on logic and suppresses his more human emotions: Star Trek
Drake Mallard has a big ego: Darkwing Duck
Peter Griffin is extremely impulsive and causes many problems for his family and friends: Family Guy
Zuko makes misguided decisions in an effort to gain his cruel father's acceptance: Avatar: The Last Airbender
Aang is too carefree and initially attempts to run from his responsibilities rather than face them: Avatar: The Last Airbender
Dean Winchester relies on family and is devastated when he loses them or they betray his trust: Supernatural
The Tenth Doctor is constantly trying to help and save the lives of others, and sometimes does things out of anger that have dire consequences later: Doctor Who
Miko Kubota is quite brash, arrogant and impulsive, even rushing into situations blindly without thinking, resulting in consequences such as her gauntlet becoming broken after rushing in headfirst to capture Ally: Glitch Techs
Twilight Sparkle is a "neurotic perfectionist" who has "a touch OCD", with fear of negative evaluation and a phobia of ladybugs (an instance of clumsy writing given that she has previously seen ladybugs without issue), and prone to suffering from nervous breakdowns when confronted with a problem that goes against her understanding: My Little Pony: Friendship Is Magic

Once Upon a Time
Rumplestiltskin's greatest character flaw was his greed, losing even those who love him over his mad desire for power. He shares this flaw with his former student and lover Cora: Once Upon a Time
Zelena's envy of her younger half-sister Regina Mills eventually transformed her into the infamous Wicked Witch of the West as she planned to reverse time and supplant Regina. Even after this plan was thwarted, her envy remained a great character flaw throughout her time on the show: Once Upon a Time
After the death of her fiancé Daniel Colter, Regina suffered a mental breakdown and became consumed with anger, which Rumplestiltskin was able to use to shape her into the Evil Queen who would cast his Dark Curse. Anger, as a fatal flaw, is one she shares with Killian Jones whose own anger transformed him into vengeful Captain Hook; however, Hook did not share Regina's mental instability: Once Upon a Time
The main character flaw of the protagonist of the series, Emma Swan, are her tendency to mistrust other people, which leads her to put up emotional barriers to protect herself and run when things get difficult. Her overcoming this flaw is a major story arc on the show: Once Upon a Time

Gaming
The Primarch Lorgar Aurelian is extremely devout and reveres his "father", the Emperor of Mankind, as a god. The Emperor envisages a human civilization free of the shackles of religion and dogma and chastises Lorgar and his legion for worshipping him. Hurt and depressed by the humiliation of his father's rebuke, Lorgar and the Space Marines of the XVII Legion (the "Word Bearers") search for another purpose to sustain them, and in doing so become the first legion to fall under the malicious influence of Chaos. Their devotion to Chaos sees them instigate the devastating civil war known as the Horus Heresy, the events of which led to the current dystopian setting of Warhammer 40,000: Warhammer 40,000
Liquid's jealousy of Solid Snake's "dominant genes" and his desire to be the better of the two sets much of the story in motion, leading to Liquid's eventual downfall: Metal Gear Solid
Kratos acts brutally and violently out of anger and desire for revenge, with devastating consequences on his only life and the world around him: God of War

References

Bibliography
 

Fiction